This article describes the history of cricket in British India from the 1918–19 season until the end of the Second World War in 1945.

Events
The Ranji Trophy was launched as India's national championship following a meeting of the Board of Control for Cricket in India (BCCI) in July 1934 and the competition began in the 1934–35 season. The trophy was donated by the Maharajah of Patiala but named after KS Ranjitsinhji ("Ranji"), even though he barely played any of his cricket in the country.  Ranji had died on 2 April 1933.  The first winner was Bombay. Since then India has undergone many changes in its cricket history.

Domestic cricket

Bombay Quadrangular winners
 1918-19 – Europeans 
 1919-20 – Hindus
 1920-21 – Hindus and Parsees shared
 1921-22 – Europeans
 1922-23 – Parsees
 1923-24 – Hindus
 1924-25 – Muslims
 1925-26 – Hindus
 1926-27 – Hindus
 1927-28 – Europeans
 1928-29 – Parsees
 1929-30 – Hindus
 1930-31 – not contested
 1931-32 – not contested
 1932-33 – not contested
 1933-34 – not contested
 1934-35 – Muslims
 1935-36 – Muslims
 1936-37 – Hindus

Bombay Pentangular winners
 1937-38 – Muslims
 1938-39 – Muslims
 1939-40 – Hindus
 1940-41 – Muslims
 1941-42 – Hindus
 1942-43 – not contested
 1943-44 – Hindus
 1944-45 – Muslims

Ranji Trophy winners
 1934-35 – Bombay
 1935-36 – Bombay
 1936-37 – Nawanagar
 1937-38 – Hyderabad
 1938-39 – Bengal
 1939-40 – Maharashtra
 1940-41 – Maharashtra
 1941-42 – Bombay
 1942-43 – Baroda
 1943-44 – Western India
 1944-45 – Bombay

Leading players by season

The lists below give the leading first-class runscorers and wicket-takers in each domestic season.

Batsmen
 1918-19:

Bowlers
 1918-19

International cricket 

India's debut in Test cricket was in the 1932 English season when they played England at Lord's Cricket Ground.  England won by 158 runs.

International tours of India

MCC 1926-27
The MCC tour was from October 1926 to February 1927.  Captained by Arthur Gilligan, the team played 26 first-class matches in India and a further four first-class matches in Ceylon.  Team members included Maurice Leyland, Andy Sandham, Bob Wyatt, Arthur Dolphin, George Geary, Ewart Astill and George Brown.

Maharaj Kumar of Vizanagram's XI 1930-31
This team, which also visited Ceylon, played six matches in India.  It included Jack Hobbs and Herbert Sutcliffe.

Ceylon 1932-33
No Tests were played, but India played Ceylon in two matches, both of which were drawn.

For more information about this tour, see: Ceylonese cricket team in India in 1932–33.

England 1933-34
This tour featured the first Test series ever played in India.  England won the series 2–0 with 1 match drawn:
 1st Test at Gymkhana Ground, Bombay – England won by 9 wickets
 2nd Test at Eden Gardens, Calcutta – match drawn	
 3rd Test at M. A. Chidambaram Stadium, Chepauk, Madras – England won by 202 runs
For more information about this tour, see: English cricket team in India in 1933–34.

Australia 1935-36
For information about this tour, see: Australian cricket team in Ceylon and India in 1935–36.

Lord Tennyson's XI 1937-38
Lord Tennyson's team of 16 English players played 15 first-class matches, including five against India, between October 1937 and February 1938.

Ceylon 1940-41
For information about this tour, see: Ceylonese cricket team in India in 1940–41.

External sources
 CricketArchive – Itinerary of Events in India

Further reading
 Rowland Bowen, Cricket: A History of its Growth and Development, Eyre & Spottiswoode, 1970
 Vasant Raiji, India's Hambledon Men, Tyeby Press, 1986
 Mihir Bose, A History of Indian Cricket, Andre-Deutsch, 1990
 Ramachandra Guha, A Corner of a Foreign Field - An Indian History of a British Sport, Picador, 2001

1945
1945